In Islam, ziyara(h) ( ziyārah, "visit") or ziyarat (ziyārat, "pilgrimage") is a form of pilgrimage to sites associated with Muhammad, his family members and descendants (including the Shī'ī Imāms), his companions and other venerated figures in Islam such as the prophets, Sufi auliya, and Islamic scholars. Sites of pilgrimage include mosques, maqams, battlefields, mountains, and caves.

Ziyārat can also refer to a form of supplication made by the Shia, in which they send salutations and greetings to Muhammad and his family.

Terminology 
Ziyarat comes from  "to visit". In Islam it refers to pious visitation, pilgrimage to a holy place, tomb or shrine. Iranian and South Asian Muslims use the word ziyarat for both the Hajj pilgrimage to Mecca as well as for pilgrimages to other sites such as visiting a holy place. In Indonesia the term is ziarah for visiting holy places or graves.

Different Muslim-majority countries, speaking many different languages, use different words for these sites where ziyarat is performed:
 Ziyāratgāh – Persian word meaning, "sites of Ziyarat"
 Imāmzādeh – in Iran, tombs of the descendants of the Twelver Imāms
 Dargah , Urdu, ; ; literally: "threshold, doorstep [of the interred holy person's spiritual sanctum];" the shrine is considered a "doorstep" to a spiritual realm) – in South Asia, Turkey and Central Asia for tombs of Sufi saints
 Ziarat or Jiarat – in Southeast Asia
 Ziyaratkhana – in South Asia (less common)
 Gongbei – in China (from Persian gonbad "dome")
 Mazar – a general term meaning a shrine, typically of a Shi'i Saint or noble.
 Maqam – a shrine built on the site associated with a Muslim saint or religious figure.

Views

Sunni 

More than any other tomb in the Islamic world, the shrine of Muhammad is considered a source of blessings for the visitor. A hadith of the Islamic prophet Muhammad states that, "He who visits my grave will be entitled to my intercession" and in a different version "I will intercede for those who have visited me or my tomb." Visiting Muhammad's tomb after the pilgrimage is considered by the majority of Sunni legal scholars to be recommended.

The early scholars of the salaf, Ahmad Ibn Hanbal (d. 241 AH), Ishaq Ibn Rahwayh (d. 238 SH), Abdullah ibn Mubarak (d. 189 AH) and Imam Shafi'i (d. 204 AH) all permitted the practice of Ziyarah to Muhammad's tomb.

According to the Hanbali scholar Al-Hasan ibn 'Ali al-Barbahari (d. 275 AH), it is also obligatory to send salutations (salam) upon Abu Bakr al-Siddiq and ‘Umar ibn al-Khattab after having sent salutations upon Muhammad.

The hadith scholar Qadi Ayyad (d. 544 AH) stated that visiting Muhammad was "a sunna of the Muslims on which there was consensus, and a good and desirable deed."

Ibn Hajar al-Asqalani (d. 852 AH) explicitly stated that travelling to visit the tomb of Muhammad was "one of the best of actions and the noblest of pious deeds with which one draws near to God, and its legitimacy is a matter of consensus."

Similarly, Ibn Qudamah (d. 620 AH) considered Ziyarat of Muhammad to be recommended and also seeking intercession directly from Muhammad at his grave. Other historic scholars who recommended Ziyarah include Imam al-Ghazali (d. 505 AH), Imam Nawawi (d. 676 AH) and Muhammad al-Munawi (d. 1031 AH). The tombs of other Muslim religious figures are also respected. The son of Ahmad ibn Hanbal named Abdullah, one of the primary jurists of Sunnism, reportedly stated that he would prefer to be buried near the shrine of a saintly person than his own father.

Salafi 

Ibn Taymiyyah condemned all forms of seeking intercession from the dead, and said that all ahadith encouraging visitation to Muhammad's tomb are fabricated (mawdu‘).

This view of Ibn Taymiyyah was rejected by mainstream Sunni scholars, both during his life and after his death. The Shafi'i hadith master Ibn Hajar al-Asqalani stated that "This is one of the ugliest positions that has been reported of Ibn Taymiyya". The Hanafi hadith scholar Ali al-Qari stated that, "Amongst the Hanbalis, Ibn Taymiyya has gone to an extreme by prohibiting travelling to visit the Prophet – may God bless him and grant him peace" Qastallani stated that "The Shaykh Taqi al-Din Ibn Taymiyya has abominable and odd statements on this issue to the effect that travelling to visit the Prophet is prohibited and is not a pious deed."

Shi'ite 

There are reasons why Shī‘ah partake in Ziyarah  which do not involve the worship of the people buried within the tombs. Ayatullah Borujerdi and Ayatullah Khomeini have both said:

The Shī‘ah do however perform Ziyarah, believing that the entombed figures bear great status in the eyes of God, and seek to have their prayers answered through these people (a form of Tawassul) – Sayyid Muhammad Hasan Musawi writes:

In this regard, Ibn Shu’ba al-Harrani also narrates a hadīth from the tenth Imām of the Twelver Shī‘as:

The Ziyarah of the Imāms is also done by the Shī‘ah, not only as a means of greeting and saluting their masters who lived long before they were born, but also as a means of seeking nearness to God and more of His blessings (barakah).  The Shī‘ah do not consider the hadith collected by al-Bukhari to be authentic, and argue that if things such as Ziyarah and Tawassul were innovations and shirk, Muhammad himself would have prohibited people as a precaution, from visiting graves, or seeking blessings through kissing the sacred black stone at the Ka‘bah.  It is a popular Shi'i belief that to be buried near the burial place of the Imams is beneficial. In Shi'i sacred texts it is stated that the time between death and resurrection (barzakh) should be spent near the Imams.

See also 
 Hajj and Umrah
 List of ziyarat locations
 Tablet of Visitation
 Jamiah kabirah Ziyarat
 List of holiest Shi'ite sites

References

Further reading 
 Sacred Gorshunova, Olga V. Trees of Khodzhi Baror: Phytolatry and the Cult of Female Deity in Central Asia // Etnograficheskoe Obozrenie, 2008, No. 1:71-82. 
 Privratsky, Bruce G.(2001) Muslim Turkistan: Kazak Religion and Collective Memory. Richmond, Surrey: Curzon.
 Subtelny, M. E. (1989) The cult of holy places: religious practices among Soviet Muslims. Middle East Journal, 43(4): 593–604.

External links 
 Ziyarat of Imam Husain
 Al-Arifeen for FAQRISM (Spiritualism & Mysticism)
 AL-Faqr for FAQRISM (Spiritualism & Mysticism)
 Views held by The Shia on Ziyarat
 Archnet shrine directory, with pictures
 Maqbara.com – Madurai Hazraths Maqbara Madurai Hazrats'Maqbara
 Book: Your Personal Guide to UMRA, HAJJ, and ZIYARAT (pdf file)
 Listing of ziyarat sites
 Visiting the Graves (Sunni)
 Visiting (the graves of) the Righteous (Sunni)
 Visiting (the tomb of) the Prophet (Sunni)

 
Islamic pilgrimages
Islamic terminology